Gerard Abood (born 28 February 1972) is an Australian cricket umpire. He has stood in matches in the Big Bash League tournament. He has also stood in women's One Day International matches in the 2014–16 ICC Women's Championship.

In November 2017, along with Geoff Joshua, he was one of the onfield umpires for the Women's Ashes Test match between Australia and England. He stood in his first Twenty20 International (T20I) match between Australia and England on 7 February 2018. He stood in his first One Day International (ODI) match between Australia and South Africa on 9 November 2018.

See also
 List of One Day International cricket umpires
 List of Twenty20 International cricket umpires

References

External links
 

1972 births
Living people
Australian cricket umpires
Australian One Day International cricket umpires
Australian Twenty20 International cricket umpires
Sportspeople from Sydney